This is a list of the National Register of Historic Places listings in Winkler County, Texas.

This is intended to be a complete list of properties and districts listed on the National Register of Historic Places in Winkler County, Texas. There is one property listed on the National Register in the county.

Current listings

The locations of National Register properties may be seen in a mapping service provided.

|}

See also

National Register of Historic Places listings in Texas
Recorded Texas Historic Landmarks in Winkler County

References

External links

Winkler County, Texas
Winkler County
Buildings and structures in Winkler County, Texas